Benisha Hamal (born ) is a Nepalese Radio jockey, model and actress. She has acted in eight movies and more than 150 music videos. She won several awards including National award in 2018 for her movie 'BlindRocks' She can be seen performing social works.

Personal life and education

Hamal was born to Bheshraj Hamal and Shakuntala Hamal in Chitwan District of Nepal. She completed her primary level education from Golden Future Boarding English School and completed her School Leaving Certificate (SLC) from Arunodaya Higher Secondary School. She completed her +2 level from Shanti Academy, Bhatarpur. For her higher studies, she went to Kathmandu in 2007 and did her BA from Kantipur College of Business Management and Humanities (major English and Mass Communication) and her MA from Goldengate International College. She likes reading novels and watching movies. Her favorite Nepali actor is Rajesh Hamal and Nepali actress is Karishma Manandhar.Apart from this she's a big fan of cricket as said in interviews she is a big fan of Paras Khadka.

Career

She worked as an RJ in Kalika FM, Bharatpur, after winning the second runner-up title of "Ideal RJ" organized by the FM itself. She also worked as VJ in various Nepali TV channels: Channel Nepal, NTV Plus and NTV. In 2009, she started her modelling career. She also appeared in many TV commercials, including ads for Yum Yum Noodles, Rio Juice, UTL, Rose Village Housing, Nova Ice-cream and Wego Scooty.

She can also be seen in various music videos. Her first music video was Sindhuli Ko by Paul Rai. She can be seen in the music videos of Timi Arkai Ghar Ko Manche by Hementa Sharma, Aau milli by Buddha Shakya, “Tadha” by Babin Pradhan, “ Chot Khada Khada” by Manoj Raj,” Ek patak” by Rupa Bista and so on.

Filmography
Her debut film as an actress was Swor directed by Prasanna Poudel in 2010. She can also be seen in movies named Mokshya, Jhyan Hajir Cha, Ma Ani Timi and so on. Milan Chams, film director, will star Benisha Hamal in the lead role in his film titled Blind Rocks.

References

Living people
1992 births
People from Chitwan District
Nepalese female models
Nepalese film actresses
Actresses in Nepali cinema
21st-century Nepalese actresses
Nepali radio presenters